The Great Manmade River Stadium (GMR or GMMR stadium)  is a football stadium situated just a few metres away from the 11 June Stadium in the heart of Tripoli's sporting city. The stadium is named after the Great Manmade River. The stadium has a capacity of around 20,000 and is currently the home of Libyan Premier League clubs Al Wahda, Al Tersana and Alamn Alaam.

The stadium was opened on 17 May 2000, and was celebrated with a friendly match between Middlesbrough F.C. and A.S. Bari.
This ground has hosted matches at international level, and the most celebrated results on this ground were won by the likes of Al Madina, who defeated ES Tunis 2–1, and on 19 September 2006, Al Ittihad defeated Al Nahdha of Oman in the 2006-07 Arab Champions League.

References

Football venues in Libya
Buildings and structures in Tripoli, Libya
2000 establishments in Libya
Sports venues completed in 2000